The 1897 Storrs Aggies football team represented Storrs Agricultural College, now the University of Connecticut, in the 1897 college football season.  This was the second year that the school fielded a football team.  The Aggies completed the season with a record of 5–2, playing for the first time as a member of the Athletic League of New England State Colleges, which served to facilitate scheduling between Connecticut, the University of Massachusetts Amherst and the University of Rhode Island.  The 1897 season marked the first contests against these two rivals.

Schedule

References

Storrs
UConn Huskies football seasons
Storrs Aggies football